Komma caudata is a cryptomonad, and the only described species in the genus Komma, although four or five more species may exist. Its cells are 4.5–5.5 μm wide by 7–10 μm long and bear two unequal flagella.

References

Cryptomonads